Paul Barrow (born 20 October 1974) is a former professional rugby league footballer who played in the 1990s and 2000s.

Playing career
Paul Barrow made his début for Warrington Wolves on Friday 15 December 1995, and he played his last match for Warrington Wolves on Sunday 8 June 1997.

Professional career
Paul Barrow enjoyed a career in the construction management and delivery industry boasting high profile clients working on several high end homes.

References

External links
Statistics at wolvesplayers.thisiswarrington.co.uk
Construction Enquirer
Construction Enquirer
PB is forced to resign from St Helens Chamber

1974 births
Living people
English rugby league players
Place of birth missing (living people)
Rugby league second-rows
Swinton Lions players
Warrington Wolves players